Imre "Imi" Tóth (born 6 September 1985 in Budapest, Hungary) is a motorcycle racer who competed for 8 years in Grand Prix motorcycle racing in the 125cc the 250cc World Championships as a privateer. He last raced in the Superbike World Championship aboard a Yamaha YZF-R1. He previously raced in the Supersport World Championship. He now owns a Supersport team called Team Tóth, which started operating when he was in 125cc (he competed as a private his entire career). He is not related to László Tóth (racing driver).

Early life
Tóth started his racing career in 1989 on an electric bike. The next year, he continued on a 50cc automatic LEM bike, with which he won his first race in 1991.

Early career
He became Hungarian champion in 1992 and 1993 with Honda QR bike in the 50cc automatic category. Then in 1994, Tóth was inaugurated to win the championship in the 50cc stick shift category.

The next step was an 80cc CASAL bike, then raced with a Honda 125cc bike, in age ten and a half, with special permission, in the Czech Republic and Croatia. In Hungary he was not permitted to start due to his young age.

At age 12, Toth became champion as the youngest rider in Slovakia.

He then finished second in the Alpok-Adria tournament in year 1997.

In the Alpok-Adria tournament Imi couldn't have participated, as the Italian regulation only allows riders from the age of fourteen onwards, but the race director permitted him to race, after checking his training results. Finishing at the seventh place, he received a special award for being the youngest rider in Italy.

After receiving the permission to race in Hungary at age 12, Tóth became the youngest Hungarian and international champion in the motorcycle racing history by winning the Hungarian Championship.

Finally, when he turned 14, he received he gained the permission to compete in European races from the European Motorcycle Union.

Career statistics

Grand Prix motorcycle racing

By season

Races by year
(key)

Supersport World Championship

Races by year

World Superbike Championship

Races by year

* Season still in progress.

References

 http://tothimi.com/2006/main.php?op=rolam&lang=eng
 http://teamtoth.com/2006/main.php?op=imi&lang=eng
 http://teamtoth.com/2006/main.php?op=imi&lang=hun 
 https://web.archive.org/web/20070625010914/http://www.motogp.com/en/motogp/motogp_riders.htm?menu=riders
 http://motorinfo.hu/news_new.php?nid=1478 
 http://forum.index.hu/Article/showArticle?t=9133297?cmd=Article_showArticle&t=9133297

External links
 

1985 births
Living people
Hungarian motorcycle racers
125cc World Championship riders
250cc World Championship riders
Sportspeople from Budapest
Supersport World Championship riders
Superbike World Championship riders